Sankar Roy (born 9 May 1995) is an Indian professional footballer who plays as a goalkeeper for Mohammedan in the I-League.

Career
Born in West Bengal, Sankar began his professional career playing for the Mohammedan Sporting in 2016–17 I-League 2nd Division. He then joined another Kolkata giant Mohun Bagan the following season, however, he spent the entire season being the second choice to club captain Shilton Paul. Sankar Roy got his break in the 2018-19 I-League season when Shilton got injured and Roy made his debut in the opening fixture on 27 October 2018 against Gokulam Kerala F.C. which ended in a 1–1 draw.

Sankar Roy's rise to fame came in the 2019-20 I-League season when he took over from Shilton Paul, who lost his form. Sankar Roy played a pivotal role as he made 14 appearances in the title-winning campaign where he kept 6 clean sheets, the highest among all.

East Bengal
On 5 May, East Bengal announced the signing of Sankar.

Career statistics

Club

Honours
Mohammedan
Sikkim Gold Cup: 2016

Mohun Bagan
I-League: 2019–20
Calcutta Football League: 2018–19

References

External links

1995 births
Living people
Indian footballers
Mohun Bagan AC players
Association football midfielders
Footballers from West Bengal
I-League players
East Bengal Club players
Mohammedan SC (Kolkata) players
Hyderabad FC players
Indian Super League players
Calcutta Football League players